One Piece: Stampede is a 2019 anime fantasy action-adventure film directed by Takashi Otsuka and produced by Toei Animation. It is the fourteenth feature film of the One Piece film series, based on the manga of the same name written and illustrated by Eiichiro Oda, and commemorates the anime's 20th anniversary. Oda was involved with the film as creative supervisor. 

One Piece Film: Stampade had its world premiere at the Osaka Station City Cinema in Osaka on August 1, 2019, and later released in Japan on August 9, 2019. It received praise for its animation, storytelling and fight sequences.

Plot 
The Straw Hat Pirates arrive at Delta Island for the Pirate Fest, a large pirate gathering organized by Buena Festa. Festa sends the pirates to a floating island to hunt for a treasure that belonged to the Pirate King, Gol D. Roger. The Straw Hats and many other pirate crews, including those from the Worst Generation as well as other past allies and enemies, set sail on a Knock Up Stream and battle each other as they race towards the treasure. However, this event is secretly set up as part of a plan between Festa and legendary pirate Douglas Bullet, who had been in the great prison Impel Down for two decades until being freed two years ago. Trafalgar Law discovers this and is attacked, but escapes onto the Thousand Sunny and warns the Straw Hats.

Robin, Sanji, Chopper and Brook go with him to investigate, followed by the undercover Smoker. After sneaking into Festa's hideout, they discover that he has conspired with the Marines to send a Buster Call on Delta Island, which would destroy it and everyone on it. As the treasure is found, a ship arrives and destroys the floating island. The pirates fall into the bay below, where Bullet takes the treasure and challenges the members of the Worst Generation to a fight. Luffy and the other Worst Generation members are quickly overwhelmed by his strength and Clank-Clank Fruit powers. He attempts to kill Luffy, but Usopp distracts him, causing Bullet to attack him instead while the other pirates attempt to flee from Delta Island, but find the Marine Buster Call fleet headed toward them. As the pirates fight the Marines, Law's group encounters Smoker in Festa's lair, and Sanji battles him while Law and Robin escape.

Sanji reveals to Smoker that Festa arranged for a Buster Call to arrive; Smoker was unaware and realizes that the Marines were set up. Law and Robin run into the former Warlord Crocodile, who wants to involve Law in a plan. Bullet confronts the Buster Call fleet and reveals his awakened Devil Fruit powers, destroying the fleet and the town around him and forming it into a gigantic colossus, with which he overwhelms the pirates and Marines. Festa reveals that the treasure in Bullet's possession is an Eternal Pose that can guide ships to Laugh Tale, the location of the most famous treasure One Piece. Bullet's dream is to become Pirate King by defeating the world's strongest people, and Festa intends to use his warpath and treasure to start a new era. After hearing of Bullet's actions, Marine Fleet Admiral Sakazuki orders a second Buster Call to attack the island. 

Sanji, Robin, Chopper, and Brook meet up, and the former two attempt to find a way to escape the island while the latter two look for Luffy. Chopper and Brook find Luffy and Usopp half dead, and Chopper treats them. After regaining consciousness, Luffy sets off to attack Bullet, but is overwhelmed. The Warlord Boa Hancock attempts to find Luffy, and she does so while running into Buggy, Smoker, Law, and Sabo in the process. Law shares his plan to defeat Bullet by tearing apart his colossus, where Crocodile as well as a lurking Rob Lucci join them. Their combined attacks destroy one of its arms, and Luffy destroys the other one with Gear Fourth. Shots fired by Usopp then destroy the rest of the colossus. Luffy and Bullet engage in a fistfight, and Luffy defeats him. Crocodile and Lucci attempt to obtain the Eternal Pose, but Luffy destroys it, claiming he will find the One Piece with his crew without help. 

Festa mourns the failure of his plans, where is defeated and captured by Sabo. Luffy reunites with his crew and they attempt to escape along with the other pirates, but are confronted by the second Buster Call fleet. However, Smoker contacts his superiors to say there is no longer a need for the Buster Call, and Sabo helps the pirates pass through the fleet safely with his abilities. It is revealed that Roger disapproved of the Eternal Pose and threw it away, believing that the One Piece could not be obtained by someone who would rely on it. Luffy's crew is shocked that he destroyed the Eternal Pose, except for Usopp. Luffy claims that if that they had taken it, they would have missed out on many great adventures.

Voice cast

Original characters 
Douglas Bullet

A former member of Gol. D Roger's pirate crew who escaped Impel Down.
Buena Festa

Known as "Master of Festivities", a promoter for the Pirate's World Fair who invites the Straw Hat Crew.
Ann

Previously voiced by Saori Hayami in a Tokyo One Piece Tower live show in which she was a singer with the ability to create illusions.
Donald Moderate

Returning cast

Production

Development 
The film was first announced following the broadcast of a One Piece Television special, Episode of Skypiea on August 25, 2018 and the title was announced alongside a teaser trailer on December 11, 2018. In December 2018, at Jump Festa 2019, Shueisha released several of Eiichiro Oda's new costume and character designs for the film. On February 20, 2019, a second trailer was released announcing Oda as the film's creative supervisor and featuring his characters designs for Bullet and Festa, movie original characters.

On July 31, 2019, Takashi Otsuka announced through Twitter that the film had completed production.

Music and soundtrack 

The film score is composed by Kohei Tanaka. The original soundtrack, containing more than 40 tracks, was released on October 30, 2019 by Avex Trax. On June 14, 2019, it was announced that WANIMA would perform the film's theme song "GONG", which was released on July 17, 2019.

Marketing 

As a promotion, it was announced that the first 3 million moviegoers will receive the One Piece Comic -Kan-Banpaku manga. A two part prequel story aired as episodes 895 and 896 of the anime series in the two weeks leading up to the film's release.
Collaborated with Uniqlo to release T-shirts based on films's designs. On August 3, 2019, Puma announced collaboration with One Piece, released shoes based on One Piece: Stampede on same day of the film release.

On August 26, 2019, it was announced that from August 30, 2019, five hundred thousand moviegoers will receive an exclusive DVD with voice acting bloopers from the movie and behind the Scenes.

The merchandise sales of the film have earned ¥5.5 billion in Japan.

Release 

The film was released in Japan on August 9, 2019 by its distributor Toei Company, on 429 screens in 352 theatres across the country.

In Asia, the film was released in Taiwan on August 21, 2019, and Neofilms released the film in Hong Kong on August 22, 2019. ODEX acquired the license to screen the film in Southeast Asia that is Singapore, Malaysia, Brunei, Indonesia and Philippines. It released the film in Singapore on September 5, 2019. Dream Express and Five Stars Agency had special previews of the film in select theaters in Thailand during September 2 to 8, 2019 and JAM released the film in Thailand nationwide on September 19, 2019. With ODEX, CBI Pictures released the film in Indonesia on September 18, 2019, GSC Movies released the film in Malaysia on September 19, 2019, The Mall Cineplex released the film in Brunei on September 19, 2019, SM Cinema released the film in Philippines on September 20, 2019. The film released in China on October 18, 2019.

In Europe, CGR Events premiered the film in France, Belgium and Luxembourg on September 12, 2019 and released in theaters on October 9, 2019 in France. Kazé screened the film in Germany and Austria on September 24, 2019 as part of the Kazé anime nights. On October 13, 2019, Stampede was screened during Scotland Loves Anime as a "mystery film", with an additional screening after its identity was announced. Koch Media released the film in Italy on October 24, 2019. Selecta Visión released the film in Spain on November 15, 2019. NOS Audiovisuais released the film in Portugal on November 28, 2019. Manga Entertainment released the film in select cinemas with both Subs and Dubs in United Kingdom on February 2, 2020 .

In Australia, Madman Entertainment premiered the film in Australia on September 15, 2019, during the Madman Anime Festival with English-subtitled and Australian wide release is on November 14, 2019.

In North America, Funimation Films released the film in select theaters in United States on October 24, 29 and 31, 2019 (Sub), October 26 and 30, 2019 (Dub) and in Canada on October 25 and November 5, 2019 (Sub), October 28 and November 8, 2019 (Dub).

In Middle East, the film was released on November 14, 2019. VOX Cinemas released the film in United Arab Emirates, Cinescape released the film in Kuwait and also the film released in Oman, Saudi Arabia, Qatar and Bahrain on November 14, 2019.

Reception

Box office 
The film saw the largest first day attendance in Japan in 2019. It opened at number one in the Japanese box office, earning ¥1,646,321,500 (about US$15.64 million) from 1,254,372 ticket sales in its first four days. The film sold 2.31 million tickets in nine days, earning ¥3.05 billion (about US$28.7 million), making it the fastest Toei-distributed film to reach ¥3 billion milestone since 2000. As of August 25, 2019, the movie has earned ¥4,133,257,100 (about US$39 million) from 3,117,929 ticket sales in seventeen days. As of September 8, 2019, the film has earned over ¥5 billion (about US$47 million) and has sold more than 3.7 million tickets. The US box office grossed $1,298,528 as of June 12, 2020.

As of November 13, 2019, the film earned  (US$93 million) worldwide.

Critical response 

Novel adaptation 
A novelization of the film by Tatsuya Hamazaki was released on August 9, 2019.

See also 
One Piece (TV series)
List of One Piece films
List of One Piece media

Notes

References

External links 
 Official website 
 
 
 
 

Stampede
Toei Animation films
2019 anime films
2019 films
Films scored by Kohei Tanaka
Funimation
Films about competitions
Treasure hunt films